Rhipicera femorata is a species of beetle in the genus Rhipicera.

Distribution 
Rhipicera femorata has been collected along the eastern coast of Australia, from Tasmania to southern Queensland and South Australia, on sandy swamplands and immediate environs, which include sedges, grasses and other swampy land trees.

References

Beetles of Australia
Beetles described in 1819
Polyphaga